The 1982 Central State Bronchos football team represented Central State University (OK) (now University of Central Oklahoma) during the 1982 NAIA Division I football season, and completed the 77th season of Broncho football. The Bronchos played their five home games at Wantland Stadium in Edmond, Oklahoma, which has been Central's home stadium since 1965. The 1982 team came off a 6–3 record from the prior season. The 1982 team was headed by coach Gary Howard. The team finished the regular season with a 7–2 record and made the program's fourth appearance in the NAIA playoffs after a three-year absence.

Schedule

After the season
The NAIA recognized wide receiver, Daric Zeno as a first team All-American. Quarterback Randy Page, was listed as a second team All-American.

References

Central State
Central Oklahoma Bronchos football seasons
NAIA Football National Champions
Central State Bronchos football